The 2013 Copa Bionaire was a professional tennis tournament played on clay courts. It was the seventh edition of the tournament which was part of the 2013 WTA 125s. It took place in Cali, Colombia on 11–17 February 2013.

Singles main draw entrants

Seeds 

 1 Rankings as of 4 February 2013

Other entrants 
The following players received wildcards into the singles main draw:
  Maria Fernanda Alves
  Catalina Castaño
  Alexandra Dulgheru
  Yuliana Lizarazo

The following players received entry from the qualifying draw:
  Inés Ferrer Suárez
  Arantxa Parra Santonja
  Laura Thorpe
  Maša Zec Peškirič

The following player received entry into the singles main draw as a Lucky Loser:
  Kateryna Kozlova

Doubles main draw entrants

Seeds

Champions

Singles 

  Lara Arruabarrena def.  Catalina Castaño 6–3, 6–2

Doubles 

  Catalina Castaño /  Mariana Duque def.  Florencia Molinero /  Teliana Pereira 3–6, 6–1, [10–5]

External links 
  

2013 WTA 125K series
2013 in Colombian tennis
2013